Equipe Europe is a French motorsport team founded in 1989 by Yvan Mahé. The team restores and enters historic cars in FIA regulated competitions.
Equipe Europe is one of leader motorsport team in Europe

2011 season

External links 
  Official Website
  TV reportage on France 3

French auto racing teams

Auto racing teams established in 1989